Destroy All Humans! is an open world action-adventure video game developed by Black Forest Games and published by THQ Nordic. It is the fifth installment in the Destroy All Humans! franchise, and a remake of the 2005 original game. This remake is the first entry in the franchise since Path of the Furon (2008).

The game was released on PlayStation 4, Windows, and Xbox One on July 28, 2020 and later on Stadia December 8, 2020. The game received mixed reviews upon release. A Nintendo Switch port was announced on April 8, 2021 and was released on June 29, 2021.

Gameplay

The game is played from a third-person perspective. The player controls Cryptosporidium 137 ("Crypto" for short), an alien who arrives on Earth in 1950s America to harvest human DNA. Crypto is equipped with a vast arsenal of alien weapons such as the Zap-O-Matic and Anal Probe, to defeat enemies. He also has superhuman skills such as psychokinetic powers and the ability to disguise himself as humans. Crypto can use a jetpack to quickly navigate the environment. He can also command the flying saucer, which is equipped with a death ray to kill opponents. Players can perform movements such as gliding and dashing, and they can chain actions together such as shooting enemies while levitating them. The game introduces the Focus Mode, which allows players to lock onto other enemies. Crypto is protected by a shield, which informs players the direction of hostile attacks. The game features six sandbox locations which can be explored freely. Each location offers unique challenges for players to complete.

Development
A team of 60 people in Black Forest Games served as the game's developer. The original game's dialogue and humor remained intact, though the team enhanced them by updating the character models and cutscenes and introducing motion capture. Instead of re-recording the lines, the team used the audio from the original game and improved its quality for the remake. The game also includes a mission named "Lost Mission of Area 42" that was scrapped during the development of the original game. Black Forest considered developing the remake as a "natural continuation" of their work after finishing the development of Fade to Silence as they learned more about utilizing the technology and designing large, open areas.

THQ Nordic acquired the intellectual property rights from THQ in 2013. In 2017, the firm reaffirmed that the company realized the demand for a new game in the series and added that they were exploring options to revitalize the franchise. The game was officially announced in June 2019. An extended gameplay demo was launched at E3 2019. It was released for PlayStation 4, Windows, Xbox One and Stadia. A standalone multiplayer spin-off, titled Destroy All Humans! Clone Carnage was released for PlayStation 4, Xbox One and Windows via Steam, on May 31, 2022.

Reception

Destroy All Humans! received "mixed or average" reviews, according to review aggregator Metacritic. Sales on the game have exceeded THQ Nordic's expectations. As of May 19, 2021, the game sold more than 1 million copies.

References
Notes

References

External links
 

2020 video games
Action-adventure games
Alien invasions in video games
Black Forest games
Video games about cloning
Destroy All Humans
Holography in fiction
Open-world video games
Nintendo Switch games
PlayStation 4 games
Science fiction video games
THQ Nordic games
Video games about extraterrestrial life
Video games developed in Germany
Video game remakes
Video games set in the 1950s
Video games set in 1959
Video games set in California
Video games set in Nebraska
Video games set in New Mexico
Video games set in South Carolina
Video games set in Tennessee
Video games set in Washington, D.C.
Xbox One games
Windows games
Unreal Engine games
Single-player video games
Stadia games